Last Mountain Creek is a river in south-central Saskatchewan. It is a tributary of the Qu'Appelle River in a region called the Prairie Pothole Region of North America, which extends throughout three Canadian provinces and five U.S. states. It is also within Palliser's Triangle and the Great Plains ecoregion.

The river is part of the Upper Qu'Appelle River watershed and starts at the southern end of Last Mountain Lake. It travels in a southerly direction for just over three miles until it meets the Qu'Appelle River in the Qu'Appelle Valley, which was formed during the last ice age. During years in which the Qu'Appelle River is high, Last Mountain Creek naturally reverses direction and flows into Last Mountain Lake. Craven Dam is located east of Last Mountain Creek's mouth on the Qu'Appelle River on the eastern side of the village of Craven. The gates of the dam are used to regulate water flows along the Qu'Appelle and can be closed to backflood water up Last Mountain Creek and into Last Mountain Lake.

River course
At the southernmost point of Last Mountain Lake, there's Valeport Marsh and a dyke that helps control the lake's water levels. Last Mountain Creek flows out of the lake at the dyke and runs along the east side of the marsh and follows Highway 20 until it meets the Qu'Appelle River at the village of Craven and highways 641 and 729. Wascana Creek meets the Qu'Appelle River just west and upstream from the mouth of Last Mountain Creek.

Tributaries
Other than Last Mountain Lake and Valeport Marsh, no named tributaries flow into Last Mountain Creek. Several tributaries flow into Last Mountain Lake, though, including Arm River, Lewis Creek, and Lanigan Creek.

Valeport Marsh 
Valeport Marsh is an extensive floodplain on the south-east corner of Last Mountain Lake at the point where Last Mountain Creek starts. A 900-acre conservation project called Valeport Wildlife Management Area Trails protects the wetlands for migratory birds, ducks, grebes, and other wildlife. It was created by the provincial government with the assistance of Ducks Unlimited Canada and is an Important Bird Area of Canada called Valeport Marsh (SK 061). The park also offers canoeing, picnicking, hiking, and walking along the top of the  dyke.

Along the west side of the Valeport Wildlife Management Area is a Nature Conservancy of Canada property called Big Valley (50°44'20.5"N 104°53'19.1"W). Big Valley is 552 acres of protected grassland and is managed for bird and wildlife habitat. While Valeport Marsh Wildlife Management Area is at the southern tip of Last Mountain Lake, Last Mountain Lake National Wildlife Area is at the northern end.

See also
List of rivers of Saskatchewan
List of protected areas of Saskatchewan

References

External links 

Rivers of Saskatchewan
Tributaries of Hudson Bay
Division No. 6, Saskatchewan
Important Bird Areas of Saskatchewan
Tributaries of the Assiniboine River